Astragalus cimae is a species of milkvetch known by the common name Cima milkvetch. It is native to the Mojave Desert and its sky island woodlands of eastern California western Nevada, especially on calcareous soils, including the Cima Dome area in the Mojave National Preserve.

Description
The plant bears an inflorescence of up to 25 flowers with reddish or pinkish purple petals sometimes tipped with white. The fruit is a legume pod with usually two inflated chambers.

References

External links
Jepson Manual Treatment - Astragalus cimae
USDA Plants Profile: Astragalus cimae
The Nature Conservancy
Astragalus cimae - Photo gallery

cimae
Flora of Nevada
Flora of the California desert regions
Mojave National Preserve
Natural history of the Mojave Desert